Iglesia de San Juan (Camoca) is a church in Asturias, Spain. It was established in the 13th century.

See also
Asturian art
Catholic Church in Spain

References

Churches in Asturias
13th-century establishments in the Kingdom of León
Bien de Interés Cultural landmarks in Asturias